Mari Lukkarinen is a Finnish orienteering competitor.

Junior career
She won a bronze medal in the classic distance at the 1990 Junior World Orienteering Championships, and a gold medal in 1991.

Senior career
She competed for Finland at the 1991 World Orienteering Championships in Marianske Lazne, where she placed fifth in the relay, together with Kirsi Tiira, Eija Koskivaara and Marja Liisa Portin.

References

Year of birth missing (living people)
Living people
Finnish orienteers
Female orienteers
Foot orienteers
Junior World Orienteering Championships medalists